Aneurus is a genus of flat bugs in the family Aradidae. There are at least 60 described species in Aneurus.

Species
These 60 species belong to the genus Aneurus:

 Aneurus albonitensis Kormilev
 Aneurus angustus Bergroth, 1914
 Aneurus arizonensis Picchi, 1977
 Aneurus avenius (Dufour, 1833)
 Aneurus barberi Kormilev
 Aneurus bispinosus Kormilev
 Aneurus bolivianus Kormilev
 Aneurus borealis Picchi, 1977
 Aneurus bosqui Kormilev
 Aneurus brevipennis Heiss, 1998
 Aneurus breviscutatus Bergroth, 1894
 Aneurus brouni Buchanan White, 1876
 Aneurus bucki Kormilev
 Aneurus championi Kormilev
 Aneurus costariquensis Kormilev, 1982
 Aneurus crenulatus Kormilev
 Aneurus deborahae Picchi, 1977
 Aneurus doesburgi Kormilev, 1974
 Aneurus fiskei Heidemann, 1904
 Aneurus foliaceus
 Aneurus fritzi Kormilev
 Aneurus froeschneri Kormilev
 Aneurus greeni Distant, 1905
 Aneurus guanacastensis Kormilev, 1982
 Aneurus haitiensis Kormilev
 Aneurus helenae
 Aneurus herediensis Kormilev, 1982
 Aneurus inconstans Uhler, 1871
 Aneurus krombeini Kormilev
 Aneurus laevis (Fabricius, 1775)
 Aneurus leptocerus Hussey, 1957
 Aneurus lobatus Matsuda & Usinger
 Aneurus maoricus Heiss, 1998
 Aneurus mexicanus Kormilev, 1980
 Aneurus minutus Bergroth, 1886
 Aneurus nasutus Kormilev
 Aneurus nodosus
 Aneurus pisoniae Kormilev
 Aneurus plaumanni Kormilev
 Aneurus politus Say, 1832
 Aneurus prominens Pendergrast, 1965
 Aneurus pusillus Kormilev
 Aneurus pygmaeus Kormilev, 1966
 Aneurus robustus Kormilev
 Aneurus roseae Picchi, 1977
 Aneurus ruandae
 Aneurus salmoni Pendergrast, 1965
 Aneurus simplex Uhler, 1871
 Aneurus tagasastei Enderlein, 1931
 Aneurus tainguensis Kormilev, 1970
 Aneurus tonkinensis Kormilev, 1973
 Aneurus vietnamensis Kormilev, 1968
 Aneurus zealandensis Heiss, 1998
 † Aneurus ancestralis (Heiss, 1997)
 † Aneurus goitschenus Heiss, 2013
 † Aneurus groehni (Heiss, 2001)
 † Aneurus incertus Heiss & al., 2015
 † Aneurus kotashevichi Heiss, 2001
 † Aneurus opertus Zhang & al., 1994
 † Aneurus ursulae Heiss, 2012

References

External links

 

Aradidae
Articles created by Qbugbot
Pentatomomorpha genera